Aiello Calabro is a town and comune in the province of Cosenza in the Calabria region of southern Italy.

See also 
 Savuto river
 1905 Calabria earthquake

External links 

 
 Website 
 Idem 
 "Story of Aiello - Normans and Hohenstaufen"

Cities and towns in Calabria